Alex Kupper (born February 14, 1990) is a free agent American football offensive guard. Kupper played offensive line for the University of Louisville and was signed as an undrafted free agent by the Houston Texans in 2013. He spent the majority of the 2013 season on the Texans' practice squad before being activated to the game-day roster in November. He was placed on the Texans' 2014 practice squad. On January 6, 2015, Kupper was signed to a reserve/future contract by the Buffalo Bills. On September 4, 2015, he was released by the Bills.

References

1990 births
Living people
Houston Texans players
Buffalo Bills players
Louisville Cardinals football players
Players of American football from Louisville, Kentucky